Mohammad Yousf Azraq (5 October 1937 in Logar, Afghanistan – 27 January 1992 in Kabul) was an Afghan historian and writer who wrote about Afghanistan's history and as well as cultural and theological backgrounds of South Asia and Middle East.

Life
Azraq was born in a peasant family in Logar province of Afghanistan. His father was a farmer and he lost his mother when he was 10 years old. Azraq had an ardent interest for education and knowledge and therefore his maternal uncle made sure Azraq achieved his goals. Azraq was enrolled at the military cadet school of Kabul in 1950 and graduated from Aerial University with outstanding results and thenceforth was given an honorary scholarship to further his education in the then Soviet Union. Upon arrival to Afghanistan, Azraq joined the Afghan Air Force as navigator; however, his main interest was writing as he never stopped it. During his lifetime he produced a number of books and numerous scholarly papers ranging from historical, cultural, religious, social and political events of Afghanistan to literary and poetic works. The tragic and untimely death of Azraq occurred when a rocket hit close to his office in the civil war of the early 1990s.

Politics and works
Azraq was an outspoken critic of hegemonic rules and sympathized with a leftest vision in the struggle against the overhang of hegemonic and imperialist forces. He saw the prosperity of Afghans in abandoning the false and mythical realization of their ethnic backgrounds and supported the notion of a collective belonging to Afghanistan regardless of ethnic or racial divides. Azraq despised the opportunist and changing political posture of Afghanistan's politics and sternly criticised its paradoxical nature. He spiritedly and diligently wrote about the virtues and goodness of Islam which he deemed as one of the most important means in uniting Afghans. He saw religion as a collective identity which was at the same time indispensable and essential in the reunification of harmony, brotherhood, human rights, cooperation etc. in social relations within the society. Azraq investigated and studied the lives and achievements of the great Afghan philosophers, poets and political activists such as Ali Sher Nawai, Jamal al-Din al-Afghani, Jalal ad-Din Muhammad Rumi and other luminary figures. Azraq's latest work was about non-Montheistic religions of the world; unfortunately his premature death did not spare him the joy and zeal to publish that masterpiece of collections. Attempts were made during the reign of the Taliban to publish the book, but the radical movement of Taliban sternly opposed the book's publishing.

Publications
History of Afghan Independence (1990)
Non-Monotheistic Religions
Islamic Cultural and Academic Institutions of Afghanistan (1990)
Acquaintance with the Holy Quran (1992)

Afghan writers
1937 births
1992 deaths